Briery Creek Wildlife Management Area is a  Wildlife Management Area in Prince Edward County, Virginia.  With terrain typical of Virginia's south-central Piedmont, it encompasses the  Briery Creek Lake, a reservoir formed by the damming of Briery Creek and Little Briery Creek.  Much of the area was historically used for tobacco farming, and more recently, timber production; today the land contains a mixture of hardwoods and loblolly pine.

Briery Creek Wildlife Management Area is owned and maintained by the Virginia Department of Game and Inland Fisheries. The area is open to the public for hunting and trapping; game species include deer, turkey, quail, rabbits, and waterfowl. Fishing and boating is facilitated by two boat ramps on Briery Creek Lake. Other permissible activities include hiking, horseback riding, and primitive camping. Access for persons 17 years of age or older requires a valid hunting or fishing permit, a current Virginia boat registration, or a WMA access permit.

See also
 List of Virginia Wildlife Management Areas

References

External links
Virginia Department of Game and Inland Fisheries: Briery Creek Wildlife Management Area

Wildlife management areas of Virginia
Protected areas of Prince Edward County, Virginia